The 2005 FIBA Asia Championship was the men's basketball qualifying tournament for FIBA Asia at the 2006 FIBA World Championship at Japan.

In order to qualify for the tournament, teams would have to go through regional qualifiers. At the main tournament, three nations qualified for the world championships: China, Lebanon and host Qatar. China defeated Lebanon in the championship game, 77–61; Qatar defeated Korea, 89–77.

Qualification

According to the FIBA Asia rules, each zone had two places, and the hosts (Qatar) and Stanković Cup champion (Korea as runner-up) were automatically qualified. The other four places are allocated to the zones according to performance in the 2004 FIBA Asia Stanković Cup.

Draw

Preliminary round

Group A

Group B

Group C

Group D

Quarterfinal round

Group I

Group II

Group III

Group IV

Classification 9th–16th

15th place

13th place

11th place

9th place

Classification 5th–8th

Semifinals

7th place

5th place

Final round

Semifinals

3rd place

Final

Final standing

Awards

References

External links
 Results
 JABBA
 sports.sina.com
 FIBA Archive

 
2005–06 in Asian basketball
2005
International basketball competitions hosted by Qatar
2005 in Qatari sport
September 2005 sports events in Asia